All Re-Mixed Up is a remix album by Puscifer. It was released on August 27, 2013 by Puscifer Entertainment. It contains alternate versions, remixes and reworks of the 12 songs from Puscifer's second studio album, Conditions of My Parole. The album also features previous Puscifer contributors, such as Carina Round, and new musicians, such as Sir Mix-a-Lot, as remixers.

Samples of the entire album were released for streaming via Amazon on July 17, 2013. The entire album was streamed on Spin magazine's official website on August 20, 2013.

Track listing

References

External links
 Puscifer's official website

2013 remix albums
Puscifer remix albums